Anique Snijders (born 15 September 1973) is a Dutch former professional tennis player.

Snijders competed on the professional tour in the 1990s, reaching a best singles ranking of 261 in the world. She qualified for three WTA Tour main draws, at the 1994 Eastbourne International, 1995 Surabaya Open and the 1996 Bol Ladies Open.

ITF finals

Singles: 1 (1–0)

Doubles: 8 (1–7)

References

External links
 
 

1973 births
Living people
Dutch female tennis players
20th-century Dutch women
20th-century Dutch people
21st-century Dutch women